Oldřich Pragr (born 25 May 2003) is a Czech footballer who currently plays as a midfielder for FC Zbrojovka Brno.

Club career

FC Zbrojovka Brno
He made his professional debut for Zbrojovka Brno in the away match against Dukla Prague on 6 November 2021, which ended in a loss 0:1. After 62 minutes he replaced Adam Fousek.

References

External links
 Profile at FC Zbrojovka Brno official site
 Profile at FAČR official site

2003 births
Living people
Czech footballers
FC Zbrojovka Brno players
Association football midfielders
1. SC Znojmo players
Czech Republic youth international footballers